Marengo crassipes is a species of spider of the genus Marengo. It is native to India and Sri Lanka.

References

References
Marengo crassipes drawings

Salticidae
Endemic fauna of India
Spiders of Asia
Spiders described in 1892